Parmenini is a tribe of longhorn beetles of the subfamily Lamiinae.

Taxonomy
 Adriopea
 Arachneosomatidia
 Athemistus
 Austrosomatidia
 Blaxotes
 Bocainella
 Caledomicrus
 Ceraegidion
 Ceylanoparmena
 Cleptonotus
 Cleptosoma
 Coresthetopsis
 Cupeyalia
 Declivocondyloides
 Deucalion
 Dorcadida
 Echthistatus
 Enotocleptes
 Falsohomaemota
 Gracililamia
 Hexatricha
 Hoplocleptes
 Inermoparmena
 Ipochus
 Luzonoparmena
 Macrocleptes
 Maisi
 Mecynome
 Mesolita
 Microcleptes
 Microsomatidia
 Microtragus
 Mynoparmena
 Myrmeparmena
 Nanilla
 Neocorestheta
 Neohoplonotus
 Neoplectrura
 Neosomatidia
 Ovaloparmena
 Paracondyloides
 Paradeucalion
 Parananilla
 Parmena
 Parmenopsis
 Parmenosoma
 Plaumanniella
 Plectrura
 Rugosocleptes
 Schreiteria
 Sinomimovelleda
 Somatidia
 Somatidiopsis
 Somatocleptes
 Spinhoplathemistus
 Spinosomatidia
 Stenauxa
 Stychoides
 Stychoparmena
 Tangavelleda Téocchi, 1997
 Tricondyloides
 Xylotoloides

References